Yamaguchi Falcão Florentino (born 24 January 1988) is a Brazilian boxer, currently a professional and a former holder of the World Boxing Council Latino Middleweight Title. In his amateur years, he won silver at the 2011 Panamerican Games and a bronze at the 2012 Olympics at light heavyweight.

Early life 
Falcão was born in São Mateus, Espírito Santo, and he is the older brother of professional boxer Esquiva Falcão.

Amateur career 
At the 2009 World Amateur Boxing Championships he beat two opponents at middleweight then lost 3:8 to eventual winner Abbos Atoev (UZB). At the 2010 South American Games he lost to Alex Theran but got a bronze anyway. Afterwards he moved up in weight. At the 2011 World Amateur Boxing Championships he beat Amine Azzouzi and Carlos Gongora, then lost to Elshod Rasulov. In Guadalajara at the PanAms he beat two opponents then lost to Cuban favorite Julio César la Cruz.

At the Olympic qualifier he beat three opponents including Osmar Bravo who also qualified then lost the final to American southpaw Marcus Browne. All three made the Olympics. At the 2012 Olympics he controversially edged out Sumit Sangwan 15:14, then Meng Fanlong 17:17, on countback before besting Cuban world champion Julio César la Cruz 18:15. He was defeated at semi-finals by the Russian favorite Egor Mekhontsev 23:11 and received the bronze medal.

Unlike what his name suggests, he is not of Japanese descent.

Professional career
On October 2, it was revealed that Falcão became a professional, signing with Golden Boy Promotions. In his debut, he was disqualified alongside Martín Fidel Ríos after the second round. Both fighters traded a few punches after the round ended followed by Ríos spitting on Falcão. The call was seen as excessive by both fighters, whom wanted to keep fighting. However, Falcão won all of his subsequent 11 fights. In the tenth, against Jorge Daniel Caraballo, Falcão got the World Boxing Council Latino Middleweight title. He is currently ranked 21st in the overall WBC Middleweight ranking.

Professional boxing record

References

External links
AIBA profile
Golden Boy profile

1988 births
Living people
Light-heavyweight boxers
Boxers at the 2012 Summer Olympics
Boxers at the 2011 Pan American Games
Olympic boxers of Brazil
Olympic bronze medalists for Brazil
Olympic medalists in boxing
Medalists at the 2012 Summer Olympics
Sportspeople from Espírito Santo
Brazilian male boxers
Pan American Games silver medalists for Brazil
Pan American Games medalists in boxing
South American Games bronze medalists for Brazil
South American Games medalists in boxing
Competitors at the 2010 South American Games
Medalists at the 2011 Pan American Games